Live On The Pacific Ocean is a 1997 live video by the Red Elvises.

Track listing 

 Aloha!
 Shoobah-doobah
 My Darling Lorraine
 Grooving To The Moscow Beat
 Three Alley Cats
 Boogie On The Beach
 Flaming Cheese
 Harriet
 Lovepipe
 Sad Cowboy Song
 Blue Moon
 Surfing In Siberia

Personnel 

 Igor Yuzov - guitar, vocals
 Oleg Bernov - bass, vocals
 Zhenya Kolykhanov - guitar
 Avi Sills - drums

1997 live albums
Red Elvises albums